NCPA may refer to:

Arts, entertainment, and media 
 National Centre for the Performing Arts (China)
 National Centre for the Performing Arts (India)

Other uses 
 Northern California Power Agency
 National Center for Policy Analysis
 National Conference of Police Associations, the precursor organization to the International Union of Police Associations